Pygopus homolog 2 is a protein that in humans is encoded by the PYGO2 gene.

References

Further reading